Mitchell's embedding theorem, also known as the Freyd–Mitchell theorem or the full embedding theorem, is a result about abelian categories; it essentially states that these categories, while rather abstractly defined, are in fact concrete categories of modules. This allows one to use element-wise diagram chasing proofs in these categories. The theorem is named after Barry Mitchell and Peter Freyd.

Details
The precise statement is as follows: if A is a small abelian category, then there exists a ring R (with 1, not necessarily commutative) and a full, faithful and exact functor F: A → R-Mod (where the latter denotes the category of all left R-modules).

The functor F yields an equivalence between A and a full subcategory of R-Mod in such a way that kernels and cokernels computed in A correspond to the ordinary kernels and cokernels computed in R-Mod. Such an equivalence is necessarily additive.
The theorem thus essentially says that the objects of A can be thought of as R-modules, and the morphisms as R-linear maps, with kernels, cokernels, exact sequences and sums of morphisms being determined as in the case of modules. However, projective and injective objects in A do not necessarily correspond to projective and injective R-modules.

Sketch of the proof 
Let  be the category of left exact functors from the abelian category  to the category of abelian groups . The Yoneda Lemma states that  is fully faithful and we also get the left exactness of  very easily because  is already left exact.

After that we prove that  is an abelian category by using localization theory (also Swan). This is the hard part of the proof.

It is easy to check that the abelian category  is an AB5 category with a generator 
.
In other words it is a Grothendieck category and therefore has an injective cogenerator .

The endomorphism ring  is the ring we need for the category of R-modules.

By  we get another contravariant, exact and fully faithful embedding  The composition  is the desired covariant exact and fully faithful embedding.

Note that the proof of the Gabriel–Quillen embedding theorem for exact categories is almost identical.

References 

  reprinted with a forward as 

Module theory
Additive categories
Theorems in algebra